The 2012 CCAA Curling Invitational Championship was held from March 21 to 24 at the Peterborough Curling Club in Peterborough, Ontario. The championship was hosted by Fleming College, which is located in Peterborough. It was the first curling tournament held by the Canadian Collegiate Athletic Association since 1990.

The Fanshawe Falcons of Fanshawe College swept the event, winning both the men's and women's championships over Red Deer College and Grande Prairie Regional College, respectively.

Men

Teams
The teams are listed as follows:

Round-robin standings
Final round-robin standings

Round-robin results
All times listed in Eastern Daylight Time.

Draw 1
Wednesday, March 21, 8:30 am

Draw 2
Wednesday, March 21, 12:30 pm

Draw 3
Wednesday, March 21, 7:00 pm

Draw 4
Thursday, March 22, 8:00 am

Draw 5
Thursday, March 22, 12 :00 pm

Draw 6
Thursday, March 22, 4:30 pm

Draw 7
Thursday, March 22, 8:30 pm

Draw 9
Friday, March 23, 11:30 am

Draw 10
Friday, March 23, 3:30 pm

Playoffs

Semifinal
Saturday, March 24, 12:00 pm

Final
Saturday, March 24, 4:00 pm

Women

Teams
The teams are listed as follows:

Round-robin standings
Final round-robin standings

Round-robin results
All times listed in Eastern Daylight Time.

Draw 1
Wednesday, March 21, 8:30 am

Draw 2
Wednesday, March 21, 12:30 pm

Draw 4
Thursday, March 22, 8:00 am

Draw 5
Thursday, March 22, 12:00 pm

Draw 6
Thursday, March 22, 4:30 pm

Draw 7
Thursday, March 22, 8:30 pm

Draw 8
Friday, March 23, 7:30 am

Draw 9
Friday, March 23, 11:30 am

Draw 10
Friday, March 23, 3:30 pm

Playoffs

Semifinal
Saturday, March 24, 12:00 pm

Final
Saturday, March 24, 4:00 pm

Awards
The all-star teams and award winners are as follows:

CCAA Curling All-Star Teams
Women
Skip: Chantal Lalonde, Fanshawe College
Third: Cassie Savage, Fanshawe College
Second: Kaitlyn Knipe, Fanshawe College
Lead: Jordan Ariss, Fanshawe College
Men
Skip: Shane Parcels, Red Deer College
Third: D.J. Ronaldson, Fanshawe College
Second: Stephen Hood, Red Deer College
Lead: Mark Dugas, Sault College

CCAA Curling Fair Play Awards
Men
Chris Jay, Fanshawe College
Women
Alyssa Cornelius, Fleming College

References

External links

CCAA Curling Home Page

CAA Curling Invitational Championship
Sport in Peterborough, Ontario
Curling in Ontario